Rodney Graham Hauser (born 31 March 1952) was a rugby union player who represented Australia.

Hauser, a scrum-half, was born in Laidley, Queensland and claimed a total of 15 international rugby caps for Australia.

During his playing career Houser was also a Physical Education teacher at St Peter’s Lutheran College, Indooroopilly, Queensland.

References

Australian rugby union players
Australia international rugby union players
1952 births
Living people
Rugby union players from Queensland
Rugby union scrum-halves